This is a list of vessels used by Ukrainian Navy. It includes main naval ships and cutters which are in service or were recently unlisted in the Ukrainian Navy as well as the auxiliary fleet, and lists ships' project numbers where a written class is unavailable or not notable – these are used by the designers to note each ship's type. As of December 2007, the Navy had 27 combat ships and cutters. Some 30 years after the fall of the Soviet Union, the main warships of the Ukrainian Navy are former Black Sea Fleet vessels that were designed and built in the Soviet Union.

Having several shipyards on its territory, the shipbuilding industry of Ukraine was mostly stalled after the fall of the Soviet Union. Following the Orange Revolution, on 9 August 2005 the Cabinet of Ukraine allocated some funding for the first major national program "Corvette" that was initiated by Minister of Defense Anatoliy Hrytsenko. The first warship-class built in the independent Ukraine was expected to produce its first vessel in 2016.

As of 24 March 2014, all of the larger ships but one (the ) of the Ukrainian Navy were captured by the Russian Black Sea Fleet. Some ships Russia returned to Ukraine (35 vessels in total). In 2015 Ukraine received 5 small  (7 and 11 meter aluminum) Willard Marine patrol boats; the original order was placed in 2013.

During the 2022 Russian invasion of Ukraine, the frigate Hetman Sahaidachny was scuttled by her crew and some one dozen or more other ships were reported captured or destroyed. In June 2022, the Navy announced that a number of boats had been mobilised, equipped for military needs and inducted into their newly announced river flotilla of 19 vessels; at least 8 vessels not previously known to be in the Navy were shown in the accompanying videos (one of which was previously a pleasure boat). Along with these 8 were 2 unidentified RIBs (which may have been pre-existing Navy vessels), 1 unidentified harbor patrol vessel and 1 other unidentified vessel. The 8 identified vessels are listed below, although it is possible that the 2 PO-2 boats among them were pre-existing Navy vessels which had their pennant numbers painted over. A subsequent video announcing the inclusion of a SHERP the Shuttle landing craft in the flotilla showed at least 2 more unidentified harbor patrol vessels.

Surface fleet

Auxiliary fleet 
In addition to the vessels which are listed below, Germany pledged 10 unmanned surface vessels of unspecified type to Ukraine. By 1 December 2022, all of these delivered.

Prospective additions

Being tested

Further arrangements 
In November 2022, the US pledged 40 armored river boats of unspecified type (from industry).

See also 
List of former ships of the Ukrainian Navy
Ukrainian Sea Guard

Notes

References

External links 
Ships of the Black Sea Fleet
Hardus, M. The harsh reality: is Ukraine ready to fight at sea (Суровая реальность: готова ли Украина воевать на море). "Apostrof". 29 January 2016.

 
Ukraine
 
Navy ships
Ukrainian Navy ships